Sherif Kallaku (born 1 March 1998) is an Albanian professional footballer who plays as a central midfielder for Albanian club Tirana and the Albania national football team.

Club career

Laçi
In July 2017, Kallaku signed his first professional contract and joined Kategoria Superiore side Laçi. He took the squad number 59, the number of his deceased father's birthday, and made his professional debut on 10 September in the opening matchday away against Partizani, coming on the second half as a substitute and netting a tap-in after a howler from goalkeeper Dashamir Xhika, as Laçi won 2–0.

International career
Kallaku made his under-21 debut on 25 March 2017 in the friendly against Moldova which ended in a goalless draw.

He received his first call up for the Albania under-20 side by same coach of the under-21 team Alban Bushi for the friendly match against Georgia U20 on 14 November 2017.

He made his senior national team debut on 11 October 2020 in a Nations League game against Kazakhstan.

Career statistics

Club

Honours

Club 
Tirana
Albanian Supercup: 2022

References

External links

1998 births
Living people
People from Krujë
Albanian footballers
Association football midfielders
Albania youth international footballers
Albania under-21 international footballers
Albania international footballers
KF Laçi players
KF Teuta Durrës players
NK Lokomotiva Zagreb players
Kategoria Superiore players
Albanian expatriate footballers
Albanian expatriate sportspeople in Italy
Expatriate footballers in Italy